Lee Ji-won (born August 30, 2006) is a South Korean actress.

Filmography

Film

Television series

Awards and nominations

Notes

References

External links
 

2006 births
South Korean child actresses
South Korean film actresses
Living people
People from Gimhae